The mountain peacock-pheasant (Polyplectron inopinatum), also known as Rothschild's peacock-pheasant or mirror pheasant, is a medium-sized, up to 65 cm long, blackish brown pheasant with small ocelli and long graduated tail feathers. Both sexes are similar. The male has metallic blue ocelli on upperparts, green ocelli on tail of twenty feathers and two spurs on legs. Female has black ocelli on upperparts, unspurred legs and tail of eighteen feathers. The female is smaller and duller than male.

A shy and elusive bird, the mountain peacock-pheasant is distributed and endemic to montane forests of the central Malay Peninsula. The diet consists mainly of berries, beetles and ants.

Mitochondrial DNA cytochrome b and D-loop as well as the nuclear ovomucoid intron G data confirms that this species belongs to a clade together with the bronze-tailed peacock-pheasant, Germain's peacock-pheasant and grey peacock-pheasant (Kimball et al. 2001).

The molecular data suggests - though not with high confidence - that this species diverged from mainland stock earlier than the bronze-tailed peacock-pheasant. This is quite spurious, since its biogeography and derived plumage, and the fact that it is a peninsular mountain endemic indicate it is derived from a fairly small founder population; this would confound molecular analyses. What seems clear is that the present species evolved from mainland Southeast Asian stock, probably during the Late Pliocene to Early Pleistocene (3.6-1 myr). The unique pattern of wings and tail thus is, contrary to long-held opinion, an autapomorphy, and the southern species of this clade - formerly separated in the genus Chalcurus - are probably not each other's closest relatives.

Due to ongoing habitat loss, small population size and limited range, the mountain peacock-pheasant is evaluated as Vulnerable on the IUCN Red List of Threatened Species. It is listed on Appendix III of CITES in Malaysia.

References
Kimball, Rebecca T.; Braun, Edward L.; Ligon, J. David; Lucchini, Vittorio & Randi, Ettore (2001): A molecular phylogeny of the peacock-pheasants (Galliformes: Polyplectron spp.) indicates loss and reduction of ornamental traits and display behaviours. Biol. J. Linn. Soc. 73(2): 187–198. HTML abstract

Footnotes

External links
 ARKive - images and movies of the mountain peacock-pheasant (Polyplectron inopinatum)
 BirdLife Species Factsheet
 Red Data Book
 Movie of the wild (male) mountain peacock-pheasant, Malaysia

mountain peacock-pheasant
Birds of the Malay Peninsula
mountain peacock-pheasant